Sobho Gianchandani (3 May 1920 – 8 December 2014) was a Pakistani Sindhi social scientist, and revolutionary writer.

Gianchandani was born in Bindi (some sources call it Bandi), a small village near the archaeological site of Mohenjo-daro. He attended NJV High School, DJ College, and SC Shahani Law College. He was the first non-Urdu recipient of the Pakistan's top literary Kamal-e-Fun Award (for 2004), which is given every year to an eminent writer in recognition of his lifelong achievements in the field of literature.

He was also a member of the Communist Party of Pakistan.

Gianchandani died on 8 December 2014 at the age of 94.

References

External links

1920 births
Pakistani writers
Sindhi people
Pakistani Hindus
Pakistani social scientists
Communist Party of Pakistan politicians
2014 deaths